Harry Ogden (18 January 1924 – 1980) was an English professional rugby league footballer who played in the 1940s and 1950s.

Playing career

International honours
Harry Ogden represented Rugby League XIII on the tour of France in 1946.

Championship final appearances
Harry Ogden played left-, i.e. number 8, in Oldham's 3-7 defeat by Warrington in the Championship Final during the 1954–55 season at Maine Road, Manchester on Saturday 14 May 1955.

County Cup Final appearances
Harry Ogden played in Oldham's 2-12 defeat by Barrow in the 1954 Lancashire County Cup Final during the 1954–55 season at Station Road, Swinton on Saturday 23 October 1954.

Club career
Harry Ogden joined Oldham in 1940 aged sixteen, and made his début for Oldham against Broughton Rangers during the 1940–41 season, he was a first team regular until a serious leg injury sustained at Workington Town in 1956 ended his playing career.

Honoured at Oldham
Harry Ogden is an Oldham Hall of Fame Inductee.

References

External links
Search for "Ogden" at rugbyleagueproject.org
Profile at www.orl-heritagetrust.org.uk
Statistics at orl-heritagetrust.org.uk

1924 births
1980 deaths
English rugby league players
Oldham R.L.F.C. players
Rugby league players from Oldham
Rugby league props
Rugby League XIII players